Zenkovsky Uyezd was a subdivision (county) of the Poltava Governorate of the Russian Empire. It was situated in the eastern part of the governorate. Its administrative centre was Zenkov (Zinkiv).

The uyezd was created in 1781 within the Chernigov Viceroyalty out of parts of Hadiach Regiment which contained territory of former Zinkiv Regiment. In 1796 the uyezd was dissolved and its territory was included into the revived Little Russia Governorate. In 1803 the uyezd was reinstated already within the Poltava Governorate. In 1923 the uyezd was liquidated with introductions of raions.

Demographics
At the time of the Russian Empire Census of 1897, Zenkovsky Uyezd had a population of 140,304. Of these, 98.1% spoke Ukrainian, 1.3% Yiddish and 0.5% Russian as their native language.

References

 
Uezds of Poltava Governorate
Poltava Governorate